NGC 2242 is a planetary nebula in the constellation Auriga. It was discovered by Lewis A. Swift on November 24, 1886, and was thought to be a galaxy until a study published in 1987 showed it to be a planetary nebula.  The nebula is located about 6,500 light-years away, and about 1,600 light-years above the galactic plane.

The central star of the planetary nebula is an O-type star with a spectral type of O(H).

References

External links 
 
 
 NED – NGC 2242
 SEDS – NGC 2242
 VizieR – NGC 2242

Planetary nebulae
Auriga (constellation)
2242